Thunder Up is the fifth and final studio album by English post-punk band the Sound, released in 1987 on Belgian record label Play It Again Sam.

Two singles were released from the album: "Hand of Love" and "Iron Years". The album and its subsequent tour precipitated the band's breakup in early 1988. Like the Sound's previous records, the album was not commercially successful, but the band largely considered it to be their best work.

History 
By 1987, the Sound were solid veterans in the music industry; they had, for instance, already passed through two record labels (Korova and Statik), released four studio albums (1980's Jeopardy, 1981's From the Lions Mouth [sic], 1982's All Fall Down and 1985's Heads and Hearts), one EP (1984's Shock of Daylight) and one live album (1985's In the Hothouse).

Background 
Thunder Up was recorded at Elephant Studio in London.

Adam Brent Houghtaling, author of This Will End in Tears, wrote that with Thunder Up, "the aggression evident on [the Sound's] earlier releases had largely calmed into a more polished guitar pop".

Release 
Thunder Up was released in 1987 by Play It Again Sam. The album and its subsequent tour precipitated the band's breakup in early 1988.

Reception 

The album was well received immediately on release by The Big Takeover, who acknowledged it as a "stunning, moving juggernaut". Critical appraisal from the mainstream press the work has largely been absent, although it was championed by Melody Maker upon release: "The Sound, by refining their despair, simply amplify their magnificence and magnify the intensity of expression".

Thunder Up was a favourite among Sound members. Drummer Michael Dudley named it as one of his favourite Sound albums (along with Propaganda), while Graham Bailey called it the band's "crowning glory". In a 1988 interview, frontman Adrian Borland said, "Ultimately I find Thunder Up the very best album, because it sounds like the band 'live' in the studio and, in a way, it actually was".

Track listing 

Note: In some editions, "You've Got a Way" is separated into two tracks, parts "I" and "II", to distinguish the initial piano piece. This brings the total number of tracks on some editions to 11.

References

External links 

 

1987 albums
The Sound (band) albums
Alternative rock albums by English artists